Angiolo Mario Crivelli, also known as Crivellone, (Milan, 1658-1730) was an Italian painter, mainly of scenes containing animals. it is unclear if he was of the family of the 15th century Lombard painters, Vittorio and Francesco Crivelli.

His son, Giovanni Crivelli (il Crivellino, died 1760), painted still lifes with fish and hunted game. He worked for the court in Parma.

References

17th-century Italian painters
Italian male painters
18th-century Italian painters
Painters from Milan
Italian painters of animals
1658 births
1730 deaths
18th-century Italian male artists